Myself is the eleventh studio album by Taiwanese singer Jolin Tsai. It was released on 13 August 2010, by Warner and Mars. The album is based on the concept of party, dance music makes up 80 percent of the album, and it was produced by Andrew Chen, Adia, and Paula Ma. 

It was received mixed response from music critics, it was praised as a new benchmark for Chinese dance-pop albums, but it was also criticized as having an imbalance between commerciality and musicality. It sold more than 65,000 copies in Taiwan, becoming the year's highest-selling album by a female artist and the year's fourth best-selling album overall in the country.

The music video of "Honey Trap" received a Golden Melody Award nomination for Best Music Video. In order to further promote the album, Tsai embarked on her third concert tour Myself World Tour on 24 December 2010 at Taipei Arena in Taipei, Taiwan and concluded on 13 April 2013 at Kaohsiung Arena in Kaohsiung, Taiwan.

Background and development 
On 27 March 2009, Tsai released her tenth studio album, Butterfly. It sold more than 1 million copies in Asia. In Taiwan, it sold more than 190,000 in Taiwan, becoming the year's highest-selling album. On 15 October 2009, Tsai founded her own entertainment company Eternal with her manager Ke Fu-hung to manage Tsai's day-to-day business affairs and coordinate the production and enforcement of copyright for Tsai's own sound recordings and concerts.

On 16 March 2010, it was reported that her new album would be released in July 2010, and Sam Chen, the president of Warner Music Greater China, said: "The album will have many international collaborations, with a budget of more than NT$50 million." On 14 June 2010, Tsai released "Take Immediate Action" through China Mobile's Migu Music. On 12 July 2010, Tsai attended a press conference for China's Got Talent and played the promotional song of the show, which was later included on the album as "Black-Haired Beautiful Girl".

Writing and recording 
"Honey Trap" is a house music with bass beat, synth timbre, and provocative lyrics, and Tsai rapped to present her sexy and deep voice. The interlude "Missed Call" opens with a melody of "Honey Trap" and is followed by an intercept message after the disconnection of the destination phone. It is a situational scene of presenting confident love attitude delivered by "Honey Trap" turning to the plight of love. "Love Player" is a mid-tempo Eurodance love song. The rhythm complements Tsai's performance, and the lyrics depicts a love player two-timed a girl. The music style is what Tsai never attempted before, and Tsai said: "In fact, I have always wanted to do different love songs, no longer ballads, but slow songs with rhythm. I have been thinking about it for many years, so when I listened to the demo of this song, I was very excited. Fortunately, the label also supported me." The interlude "Secret Talk" opens with voice message recorded by Tsai, and then a clamor of friends on the other end of the line. Tsai said: "The interlude follows 'Love Player', and it is about a woman who shuts herself up at home after broke up, and her friends urge her to come out." Tsai provided a lot of personal ideas on the music arrangement and production of "Party Star", such as the simulated sound effect of police inspection, which made it have a strong sense of pictures. The interlude "Let's Start the Dance" pays tribute to vogue dancer predecessors, Tsai said that she saw some photos of drag queens in Benny Ninja's photo album, she added: "He detailed the history of vogue, because most of the vogue dancers in foreign countries are drag queens, so most of names I called in the interlude are famous drag queens." "Black-Haired Beautiful Girl" is based on the concept of oriental black hair, and it describes the inner and outer beauty of oriental women. It was influenced by the element of disco, and it depicts the independent feminist attitude.

"Nothing Left to Say" merged urban pop with soft rock, and piano timbre also complements R&B beat. Tsai said: "The song merged R&B with rock, so we didn't design too much sound shift, because the most iconic feature of R&B is sound shift, but we added rock, its lyrics and music arrangement are to let people express emotions, not to make a fuss about an imaginary illness or to sing with tenderness." The interlude "L'amour est parti" is a situational dialogue in French of breaking up between lovers, and it connects the preceding song and the following song. Tsai said: "I studied French during my break and wanted to put the language on the album, hoping to present the feeling of old movies, like those played on the black-and-white television." The lyrics of "Real Hurt" are simple and resonant, and they take "small wound" as the entry point, describing the tough and fragile love relationship. The strings and piano melodies of the song touch people's hearts, and the song is a ballad describing the feeling of breaking up. "Macho Babe" describes the independence and courage of modern women. Tsai said: "Modern women don'y need to please men to reflect their own value. The idea of 'Macho Babe' is not against men, but mainly to reflect women's personality, especially their independence and autonomy." "Butterflies in My Stomach" was influenced by exotic music elements, and it depicts the ambiguity between men and women. "Let's Break Up" is full of sadness and depression. The interlude "I Love You Too" reflects that Tsai missed the most innocent moments of love. "Take Immediate Action" is a moderate sweet love song.

Title and artwork 
On 7 July 2010, Tsai revealed that the album's title would be "Vogue", and she said: "This is the most participated album since my debut, it reveals the most honest self, so I'm really looking forward to it. It is arguably the most exciting album I've ever made", adding that: "To me, vogue represents an attitude, a spirit, and a confidence, not only beautiful appearance or luxurious clothes, in my mind, vogue represents a life attitude and real self." On 14 July 2010, Warner announced that the album's title had changed to "Vogueing", and Tsai described that it was inspired by the dance of vogue and emphasizes the present continuous tense. On 21 August 2010, the album's title changed to "Myself", and Tsai said: "I have spent a lot from the beginning, and it is the most dedicated album over the years, from lyrics and music to interludes, and to costumes and music videos, as long as I have any good ideas I will report to my label, and then invite professionals to provide more advice, so it is called 'Myself'."

The album has standard and pre-order editions, and the cover arts are different. The standard edition's cover art features Tsai wearing a white petal shoulder pads with a blonde short wig, and the pre-order edition's cover art features Tsai wearing black ripped tank top with windproof goggles. Tsai said: "This time I want to do a lot of different things, I actually want to show a more healthy sex appeal. When I tried to put on the blonde wig, I thought it looks cool and futuristic."

Release and promotion 
On 15 July 2010, Warner announced that the album would be available for pre-order on 20 July 2010 and would be released on 3 August 2010. On 21 July 2010, Warner announced that the pro-order date would postpone to 22 July 2010 and the release date would postpone to 10 August 2010. On 9 August 2010, Warner announced that the release date would postpone to 13 August 2010. The album includes eight dance songs, two ballads, and five interludes. Tsai said: "I have never tried to include a lot of dance songs on the album, though everyone remembers my music style is mainly dance-pop, foreign artists such as South Korean artists also love dance music. Maybe a lot of people go to karaoke box to sing ballads, but they may often prefer to listen to dance music in leisure time, so this time I suggested to my label this concept album should be based on the concept of party, to make everyone happy, so it should be based on dance songs. Moreover, adding five interludes is something I've never done before, but I have heard such idea had been used in Western artists' albums before, so I want to see if I can also put the idea in Mandarin albums, especially dance-pop albums." 

On 13 August 2010, Tsai held a press conference for the album in Beijing, China. On 25 August 2010, Tsai held a press conference in Taipei, Taiwan and announced that the album peaked at number one on the weekly album sales charts of Five Music, G-Music, and Pok'elai in Taiwan. On 29 October 2010, Tsai released the deluxe celebration edition of the album, and it additionally includes six remixes, six music videos, and one behind-the-scenes footage. On 12 November 2010, it was reported that it had sold more than 65,000 copies in Taiwan, becoming the year's highest-selling album by a female artist and the year's fourth highest-selling album overall in the country. On 28 December 2010, Tsai released the LP edition of the album.

Live performances 

On 31 July 2010, Tsai attended the Taiwanese television show Super King to perform "Honey Trap". On 12 August 2010, she attended the Taiwanese television show Power Sunday to perform "Honey Trap". On 27 August 2010, she attended the Taiwanese television show One Million Star to perform "Honey Trap". On 2 September 2010, she attended the Chinese television show Singing & Dancing to perform "Honey Trap", "Love Player", and "Real Hurt". On 4 September 2010, she attended the Chinese television show We Are Family to perform "Honey Trap" and "Take Immediate Action". On 22 September 2010, she performed "Honey Trap" at the 2010 CCTV Mid-Autumn Festival Gala. On the same date, she attended the Chinese television show Happy! to perform "Honey Trap", "Take Immediate Action", and "Real Hurt".

On 24 September 2010, she attended the Chinese television show Day Day Up to perform "Honey Trap" and "Real Hurt". On 10 October 2010, she attended the grand final of China's Got Talent to perform "Black-Haired Beautiful Girl". On 31 December 2010, she performed "Honey Trap" and "Real Hurt" at the Open Your Dream New Year's Eve Concert in Kaohsiung, Taiwan. On the same date, she performed "Honey Trap" and "Take Immediate Action" at the E-Da World New Year's Eve Concert in Kaohsiung, Taiwan. On 9 April 2011, she performed "Honey Trap" at the 1st Global Chinese Golden Chart Awards. On 24 April 2011, she performed "Honey Trap" at the 2011 Music Radio China Top Chart Awards. Since then, Tsai has attended a series of events and performed songs from the album.

Singles 

On 14 July 2010, Tsai released the single, "Honey Trap". On 27 July 2010, Tsai released the music video of "Honey Trap", which was directed by Cha Eun Taek with a budget of NT$10 million. Tsai also performed vogue in the music video, and she said: "In fact, I have always watched some performers voguing, when I first listened to the demo of 'Honey Trap', I wanted to perform vogue, so I asked my choreographer to help me find a vogue dance teacher, and then he found the instructor of America's Next Top Model to teach me. The teacher told me the origin of vogue. He not only taught me the dance moves, but also taught me the meaning behind, which is to have confidence and attitude." The song also pays tribute to her icon Madonna, and she said: "When you think of vogue, you think of Madonna's classic song "Vogue". I have always admired Madonna. She keeps changing her image to make all her fans feel that she works hard, which is a great inspiration for me."

On 20 October 2010, Tsai released the second single, "Honey Trap (Dance with Me remix)", and it includes the track "Macho Babe (Cheerleading remix)". The remix version of "Honey Trap" was remixed by George Leung, and remix version of "Macho Babe" was remixed by DJ Oscar. In January 2011, "Honey Trap", "Nothing Left to Say", and "Love Player" reached number one, number 20, and number 55 on the 2010 Hit FM Top 100 Singles of the Year chart, respectively.

Music videos 
On 8 August 2010, Tsai released the music video of "Love Player", which was directed by Marlboro Lai. Tsai also provided with several ideas for the music video, including the story script and the color tone. The music video describes a love player two-timed a girl, and the girl dances to relieve the negative feelings. Tsai said: "The lyrics of the song are about meeting a love player, so I told the director that we should stop talking about how a boy get rid of a girl, or a girl always cry. The song is a little bit mysterious and sexy, so I hope the director can show even though the boy made the girl heartbreak, the girl still has to live a good life and show her confidence. So in the video I took off clothes alone at home, did a little sexy dance moves, and the mosaic is just a little trick."

On 19 August 2010, Tsai released the music video of "Nothing Left to Say", which was directed by Bill Chia. It depicts the helpless emotion after lovers broke up. On 1 September 2010, Tsai released the music video of "Butterflies in My Stomach", which was directed by Marlboro Lai. There is no special story in the music video, Tsai only danced to interpret the song. On 7 September 2010, Tsai released the music video of "Take Immediate Action", which was directed by Marlboro Lai and was based on the concept of friends party. On 9 September 2010, Tsai released the music video of "Real Hurt", which was directed by Sam Hu, and it describes the girl's loneliness after broke up. On 1 November 2010, Tsai released the music video of "Black-Haired Beautiful Girl", which was directed by Kuang Sheng.

Touring 

On 26 August 2010, Tsai revealed that she would embark on a new concert tour around Christmas of the year. On 15 November 2010, Tsai held a press conference in Taipei for her concert tour Myself World Tour, she announced that the tour would embark on 24 December 2010 at Taipei Arena in Taipei, Taiwan and it would be based on the concept of party, and she invited Benny Ninja to be the special guest. It concluded on 13 April 2013 at Kaohsiung Arena in Kaohsiung, Taiwan. Comprising 35 shows, it grossed NT$1.5 billion and played in front of 600,000 people from 31 cities in Asia, Europe, and Oceania. On 19 October 2013, Tsai released the live video album, Myself World Tour, which documented the Taipei dates of the tour on 22–23 December 2012 at Taipei Arena.

Critical reception 

The album received mixed response from music critics. Writing for NetEase, Xiong Ziang called it a "clear, well-made Chinese dance-pop album." Wang Shuo commented: "Tsai did't blindly pursue fashion, but adopted dance-rock, which seems to be more in line with contemporary people's appreciation of dance music." Sanshi Yisheng gave the album 3 out of 5 stars, and commented: "Even though there is still room of improvement for most songs, the dance-oriented singer had done enough in terms of the integrity and consistency of the album." Liang Xiaohui wrote: "Looking at the album as a whole, it intended to become Tsai's new milestone. Although it is conservative and imperfect, we have to admit the album is still her another successful attempt", adding that: "Perhaps, in the future, when we look back on C-pop diva of the early 21st century, the name that first comes to our mind would be Jolin Tsai rather than others, just like when we look back on the second half of the 20th century, we can never avoid the sparkling name of Madonna."

Writing for Sina, Eric commented: "The music direction of this album is mature compared to her previous works, giving full play to her dancing talent, heading for 'dance-pop queen'", adding that: "Looking at the whole album, Tsai once again shows her amazing sincerity, no matter the dance or music, it can be said is elaborate, in order to complement the concept album, they also offer a big budget for the visuals." Liu Shuiji wrote: "This time Tsai worked very attentively, the overall vocal performance is stable, the album has an average quality and a good consistency, the music arrangement is also a highlight, but the album's concept is too gimmicky, it doesn't reflect her actual inner thoughts, perhaps it is just the imbalance between commerciality and musicality, it will be a problem that continues to trouble her." Lin Juli of NetEase commented: "The inadequacy is not the conception, but the music itself." 

Writing for Tencent, Lan Hudie rated the album 3.5 out of 5 stars, reasoning that: "Although it has diverse styles and well-made production, the album lacks of her impression left on the audience originally." Lao You gave the album 3.2 out of 5 stars, and commented: "The well-made music arrangement directly exposes the dryness of melody. This is the first time that no tracks on Tsai's album has potential to be popular. After listened to the whole album, besides its music arrangement, there is no memory points, and it is undoubtedly fatal." Shuwa gave the album 3.8 out of 5 stars, reasoning that: "The difference between the actual content and what they asserted is big, and it exposes Tsai's awkwardness and entanglement on music." Shui Shui rated the album 3.8 out of 5 stars, and commented: "There's nothing special about the five Interludes, and those make people have a feeling that they were added deliberately."

Accolades 
On 15 January 2011, "Love Player" won a Baidu Hot Point Award for Top 10 Songs (Hong Kong/Taiwan). On 16 January 2011, Tsai won a KKBox Music Award for Top 10 Singers. On 21 January 2011, Tsai won a China Original Music Pop Chart Award for Best Female Singer (Taiwan). On 2 February 2011, Tsai won Top 10 Female Singers at the 2011 Super Star On 16 March 2011, Tsai won My Astro Music Awards for Top Female Singer (Overseas) and Presenter Female Singer (Overseas), "Honey Trap" won Top Dance Song and Top 20 Songs, and "Love Player" won Top 20 Songs. On 9 April 2011, Tsai won Global Chinese Golden Chart Awards for Favorite Female Singer and DJ Favorite Artist, and "Honey Trap" won for Top 20 Songs and Hit FM Top 100 Number One Song.

On 24 April 2011, Tsai won a Music Radio China Top Chart Award for Favorite Singer (Hong Kong/Taiwan), and "Honey Trap" won Top Played Radio Song and Top Songs (Hong Kong/Taiwan). On 13 May 2011, the music video of "Honey Trap" earned a Golden Melody Award nomination for Best Music Video. On 24 June 2011, she won a Migu Music Award for Most Searched Female Singer. On 17 August 2011, she won a Top 10 Stars Award for Top 10 Stars. On 14 December 2011, she won a Yahoo Asia Buzz Award for Favorite Female Singer. On 22 December 2011, she won an Apple Daily Music Award for Best Female Singer.

Track listing

Release history

References

External links 
 
 
 

2010 albums
Jolin Tsai albums
Warner Music Taiwan albums